Giovanni Battista Bussi may refer to:
 Giovanni Battista Bussi (1656–1726), Italian cardinal
 Giovanni Battista Bussi (1755–1844), Italian cardinal
 Giovanni Battista Bussi de Pretis (1721–1800), Italian cardinal